Geneva is the second-most-populous city in Switzerland.

Geneva may also refer to:

Geography

Landforms
Lake Geneva, Switzerland (on which the city is situated)
Geneva Lake, Wisconsin
Geneva Spur, a ridge on Mount Everest

Regions
Canton of Geneva, of which the city of Geneva is the capital

Settlements in the United States
Geneva, Alabama
Geneva County, Alabama
Geneva, California
Geneva, Florida
Geneva, Georgia
Geneva, Idaho
Geneva, Illinois
Geneva Township, Kane County, Illinois
Geneva, Indiana
Geneva, Shelby County, Indiana
Geneva, Iowa
Geneva, Kansas
Geneva, Kentucky
Geneva (Alexandria, Louisiana)
Geneva Township, Midland County, Michigan
Geneva Township, Van Buren County, Michigan
Geneva, Minnesota
Geneva Township, Minnesota
Geneva, Nebraska
Geneva Township, Fillmore County, Nebraska
Geneva (city), New York
Geneva (town), New York
Geneva, Ohio, a city in Ashtabula County
Geneva, Fairfield County, Ohio, an unincorporated community
Geneva Township, Ashtabula County, Ohio
Geneva, Oregon
Geneva, Pennsylvania
Geneva, Washington
Geneva, Wisconsin

Structures
Geneva camp, a refugee camp in Bangladesh
Geneva College, a private liberal arts college in Beaver Falls, Pennsylvania, U.S.

Arts and entertainment 

Geneva (band), a mid-1990s Scottish rock group
Geneva (Love of Life Orchestra album), 1980
Geneva (play), a 1938 satire by George Bernard Shaw
Geneva (Russian Circles album), 2009
Geneva (singer) (Ioana Oegar-Toderaș; born 1987), Romanian-American rapper

Technology
Boule de Genève (Geneva ball), a type of pendant watch in the shape of a small ball
Geneva ERS, IBM's enterprise reporting system software
Geneva (typeface), a typeface commonly used in Macintosh computers
Geneva Steel, a World War II-era steel factory in Vineyard, Utah
Geneva Steam Automobile Company, a defunct American automobile manufacturer

Other uses
Geneva (given name), a feminine given name
Geneva, an obsolete name for gin

See also
Geneva Conventions, a set of international treaties chiefly concerning the treatment of non-combatants and prisoners of war
Geneva Conference (disambiguation), various conferences
Geneva drive, a mechanism that translates a continuous rotation into an intermittent rotary motion
Genova (disambiguation)
Ginebra (disambiguation)